SS Oriana was the last of the Orient Steam Navigation Company's ocean liners. She was built at Vickers-Armstrongs, Barrow-in-Furness, Cumbria, England and launched on 3 November 1959 by Princess Alexandra. Oriana first appeared as an Orient Line ship, with a corn-coloured hull, until 1966, when that company was fully absorbed into the P&O group. Faced with unprofitable around-the-world passenger routes, the P&O white hulled Oriana was operated as a full-time cruise ship from 1973. Between 1981 and her retirement from service five years later, Oriana was based at Sydney, Australia, operating to Pacific Ocean and South-East Asian ports. Deemed surplus to P&O's requirements in early 1986, the vessel was sold to become a floating hotel and tourist attraction, first in Japan and later in China. As a result of damage sustained from a severe storm whilst in the port of Dalian in 2004, SS Oriana was finally sold to local breakers in 2005.

History

In May 1954 the Orient Steam Navigation Company began planning to replace SS Orontes and RMS Orion on the United Kingdom to Australia route.  One ship was called for, named Orbustus in the early stages of planning, before Oriana was settled on – a poetic reference to both Queen Elizabeth I of England and the recently crowned Queen Elizabeth II.

Oriana's maiden voyage was from Southampton to Sydney in December 1960, during this voyage the Oriana was the first ocean liner to berth at the Fremantle Passenger Terminal. At 41,915 gross register tons and with capacity for more than 2,000 passengers in two classes (first and tourist), Oriana was briefly the largest passenger liner in service on the UK to Australia and New Zealand route, until the introduction of the 45,733 ton SS Canberra in 1961. The Canberra could never match the Oriana for speed, however, the latter having achieved 30.64 knots during her pre-hand over trials in 1960 and held the Golden Cockerel trophy for the fastest ship in the P&O fleet which she retained until she retired in 1986, when it was handed back to the Canberra (in spite of the fact that Canberra's speed had by then been reduced to 23 knots). On Canberra's final cruise the Golden Cockerel  was handed over to the new MV Oriana when both ships were anchored off Cannes and sent boats out to perform the handover.

United States.

In August 1970, the Oriana caught fire while steaming out of Southampton. This serious fire occurred when the boiler room caught fire at the beginning of its journey across the Atlantic on its way to USA, New Zealand, and Australia. Repairs took more than two weeks.

From 1973, Oriana was converted to operate as a one class cruise ship and from 1981 until retirement in March 1986 was based in Sydney. After a layup of two months at No. 21 Pyrmont Wharf, Sydney, the ship was sold and moved to Osaka, Japan, to become a floating hotel. The ship served as a floating museum at Beppu, Ōita, from 1987 but this venture was ultimately not successful, and she was subsequently sold to Chinese interests in 1995. The ship served as a floating hotel and tourist attraction in Shanghai until 2002, when she was moved to Dalian. In 2004 Oriana was damaged in a storm. Repairs proved to be unfeasible, so she was towed to a ship breakers yard and dismantled in 2005.

In 1995, the name Oriana was assigned to the P&O Cruises ship MV Oriana.

See also 
 Orient Steam Navigation Company

References

Further reading

External links 
 Oriana at SS Maritime

Ships of P&O (company)
Ships built in Barrow-in-Furness
1959 ships
Ships of P&O Cruises
Ships of the Orient Line